9 km is the name of several rural localities in Russia:
9 km, Republic of Mordovia, a settlement of the crossing in Plodopitomnichesky Selsoviet of Ruzayevsky District of the Republic of Mordovia; 
9 km, Orenburg Oblast, a crossing loop in Barabanovsky Selsoviet of Novosergiyevsky District of Orenburg Oblast;

See also
9-y km Mamayevskoy zheleznodorozhnoy vetki, a rural locality (a settlement) in Kletnyansky District of Bryansk Oblast
Putevaya Usadba 9 km zheleznoy dorogi Luostari–Nikel, a rural locality (an inhabited locality) in Pechengsky District of Murmansk Oblast
Tupik 9 km, a rural locality (a settlement) in Zubovo-Polyansky District of the Republic of Mordovia
Devyaty kilometre, name of Solnechny, a rural locality (a settlement) in Usolsky District of Perm Krai, before 2013